Sweden is a country in Northern Europe on the Scandinavian Peninsula. It borders Norway to the west; Finland to the northeast; and the Baltic Sea and Gulf of Bothnia to the south and east. At , Sweden is the largest country in Northern Europe, the fifth largest in Europe, and the 55th largest country in the world.

It has maritime borders with Denmark, Germany, Poland, Russia, Lithuania, Latvia and Estonia, and it is also linked to Denmark (southwest) by the Öresund bridge.

Terrain 

Much of Sweden is heavily forested, with 69% of the country being forest and woodland, while farmland constitutes only 8% of land use. Sweden consists of 39,960 km2 
of water area, constituting around 95,700 lakes. The lakes are sometimes used for water power plants, especially the large northern rivers and lakes.

Most of northern and western central Sweden consists of vast tracts of hilly and mountainous land called the Norrland terrain. From the south the transition to the Norrland terrain is not only seen in the relief but also in the wide and contiguous boreal forests that extend north of it with till and peat being the overwhelmingly most common soil types.

South of the Norrland terrain lies the Central Swedish lowland which forms a broad east-west trending belt from Gothenburg to Stockholm. This is the traditional heartland of Sweden due to its large population and agricultural resources. The region forms a belt of fertile soils suitable for agriculture that interrupts the forested and till-coated lands to the north and south. Before the expansion of agriculture, these fertile soils were covered by a broad-leaved tree forest where maples, oaks, ashes, small-leaved lime and common hazel grew. The Central Swedish lowland does however also contain soils of poor quality, particularly in hills where Scots pine and Norway spruce grow on top of thin till soils. Agriculture aside, the region benefits also from the proximity of hydropower, forest and bergslagen's mineral resources. Sweden's four largest lakes, Vänern, Vättern, Mälaren and Hjälmaren, lie within the lowlands.

To the south of the Central Swedish lowland lies the South Swedish highlands which except for a lack of deep valleys is similar to the Norrland terrain found further north in Sweden. The highest point of the highlands lies at 377 m. Poor soil conditions have posed significant difficulties for agriculture in the highlands, meaning that over time small industries became relatively important in local economies. 

Southernmost Sweden contains a varied landscape with both plains and hilly terrain. A characteristic chain of elongated hills runs across Scania from northwest to southeast. These hills are horsts located along the Tornquist Zone. Some of the horsts are Hallandsåsen, Römelåsen and Söderåsen. The plains of Scania and Halland make up 10% of Sweden's cultivated lands and are the country's main agricultural landscape. Productivity is high relative to the rest of Sweden and more akin to that of more southern European countries. The natural vegetation is made up of broadleaf forest although conifer plantations are common. Southern Sweden has Sweden's greatest animal and plant diversity.

The two largest islands are Gotland and Öland in the southeast. They differ from the rest of Sweden by being made up of limestone and marl with an alvar vegetation adapted to the island's calcareous soils. Gotland and Öland have landforms that are rare or absent in mainland Sweden. These include active cliffs seen in segments of their western coasts, sea stacks called rauks and large cave systems.

Political divisions

Provinces 

Sweden has 25 provinces or landskap ("landscapes"), based on culture, geography and history: Bohuslän, Blekinge, Dalarna, Dalsland, Gotland, Gästrikland, Halland, Hälsingland, Härjedalen, Jämtland, Lapland, Medelpad, Norrbotten, Närke, Skåne, Småland, Södermanland, Uppland, Värmland, Västmanland, Västerbotten, Västergötland, Ångermanland, Öland and Östergötland.

While these provinces serve no political or administrative purpose, they play an important role for people's self-identification. The provinces are usually grouped together in three large lands (landsdelar): the northern Norrland, the central Svealand and southern Götaland. The sparsely populated Norrland encompasses almost 60% of the country.

Counties 

Administratively, Sweden is divided into 21 counties, or län. In each county there is a County Administrative Board, or länsstyrelse, which is appointed by the national government.

In each county there is also a separate County Council, or region (before 1 januari 2020 called landsting), which is the municipal representation appointed by the county electorate.

K = Blekinge County
W = Dalarna County
I = Gotland County
X = Gävleborg County
N = Halland County
Z = Jämtland County
F = Jönköping County
H = Kalmar County
G = Kronoberg County
BD = Norrbotten County
M = Skåne County
AB = Stockholm County
D = Södermanland County
C = Uppsala County
S = Värmland County
AC = Västerbotten County
Y = Västernorrland County
U = Västmanland County
O = Västra Götaland County
T = Örebro County
E = Östergötland County

The letters shown were on the vehicle registration plates until 1973.

Municipalities 

Each county is further divided into municipalities or kommuner, ranging from only one (in Gotland County) to forty-nine (in Västra Götaland County). The total number of municipalities is 290.

The northern municipalities are often large in size, but have small populations – the largest municipality is Kiruna with an area as large as the three southern provinces in Sweden (Scania, Blekinge and Halland) combined, but it only has a population of 25,000, and its density is about 1 / km2.

Population 
Sweden has a population of 10 million as of January 2017. The mountainous north is considerably less populated than the southern and central regions, partly because the summer period lasts longer in the south, and this is where the more successful agricultural industries were originally established. Another historical reason is said to be the desired proximity to key trade routes and partners in continental Europe, e.g. Germany. As a result, all seven urban areas in Sweden with a population of 100,000 or more, are located in the southern half of the country.

Cities 

Cities and towns in Sweden are neither political nor administrative entities; rather they are localities or urban areas, independent of municipal subdivisions.
The largest city, in terms of population, is the capital Stockholm, in the east, the dominant city for culture and media, with a population of 1,250,000. The second largest city is Gothenburg, with 510,500, in the west. The third largest is Malmö in the south, with 258,000. The largest city in the north is Umeå with 76,000 inhabitants.

Natural resources 
Sweden's natural resources include copper, gold, hydropower, iron ore, lead, silver, timber, uranium, and zinc.

Environment 

Acid rain has become an issue because it is damaging soils and lakes and polluting the North Sea and the Baltic Sea. The HBV hydrology transport model has been used to analyze nutrient discharge to the Baltic from tributary watersheds.

Climate 

Most of Sweden has a temperate climate, despite its northern latitude, with largely four distinct seasons and mild temperatures throughout the year. The winter in the far south is usually weak and is manifested only through some shorter periods with snow and sub-zero temperatures, autumn may well turn into spring there, without a distinct period of winter. The northern parts of the country have a subarctic climate while the central parts have a humid continental climate. The coastal south can be defined as having either a humid continental climate using the 0 °C isotherm, or an oceanic climate using the –3 °C isotherm.

This grows further when comparing areas in the northern interior where the winter difference in the far north is about  throughout the country. The warmest summers usually happen in the Mälaren Valley around Stockholm due to the vast landmass shielding the middle east coast from Atlantic low-pressure systems in July compared to the south and west. The colder temperatures are influenced by the higher elevation in the northern interior. As a result of the mild summers, the arctic region of Norrbotten has some of the northernmost agriculture in the world.

Sweden is much warmer and drier than other places at a similar latitude, and even somewhat farther south, mainly because of the combination of the Gulf Stream and the general west wind drift, caused by the direction of planet Earth's rotation. Continental west-coasts (to which all of Scandinavia belongs, as the westernmost part of the Eurasian continent), are notably warmer than continental east-coasts; this can also be seen by comparing e.g. the Canadian cities of Vancouver and Halifax, Nova Scotia with each other, the winter in west coast Vancouver is much milder; also, for example, central and southern Sweden has much milder winters than many parts of Russia, Canada, and the northern United States. Because of Sweden's high latitude, the length of daylight varies greatly. North of the Arctic Circle, the sun never sets for part of each summer, and it never rises for part of each winter. In the capital, Stockholm, daylight lasts for more than 18 hours in late June but only around 6 hours in late December. Sweden receives between 1,100 and 1,900 hours of sunshine annually.

Temperatures expected in Sweden are heavily influenced by the large Fennoscandian landmass, as well as continental Europe and western Russia, which allows hot or cool inland air to be easily transported to Sweden. That, in turn, renders most of Sweden's southern areas having warmer summers than almost everywhere in the nearby British Isles, even matching temperatures found along the continental Atlantic coast as far south as in northern Spain. In winter, however, the same high-pressure systems sometimes put the entire country far below freezing temperatures. There is some maritime moderation from the Atlantic which renders the Swedish continental climate less severe than that of nearby Russia. Even though temperature patterns differ between north and south, the summer climate is surprisingly similar all through the entire country in spite of the large latitudinal differences. This is due to the south's being surrounded by a greater mass of water, with the wider Baltic Sea and the Atlantic air passing over lowland areas from the south-west.

Apart from the ice-free Atlantic bringing marine air into Sweden tempering winters, the mildness is further explained by prevailing low-pressure systems postponing winter, with the long nights often staying above freezing in the south of the country due to the abundant cloud cover. By the time winter finally breaks through, daylight hours rise quickly, ensuring that daytime temperatures soar quickly in spring. With the greater number of clear nights, frosts remain commonplace quite far south as late as April. The cold winters occur when low-pressure systems are weaker. An example is that the coldest ever month (January 1987) in Stockholm was also the sunniest January month on record.

The relative strength of low and high-pressure systems of marine and continental air also define the highly variable summers. Nights normally remain cool, especially in inland areas. Coastal areas can see so-called tropical nights above  occur due to the moderating sea influence during warmer summers. Summers can be cool, especially in the north of the country. Transitional seasons are normally quite extensive and the four-season climate applies to most of Sweden's territory, except in Scania where some years do not record a meteorological winter (see table below) or in the high Lapland mountains where polar microclimates exist.

Despite northerly locations, southern and central Sweden may have almost no snow in some winters. Most of Sweden is located in the rain shadow of the Scandinavian Mountains through Norway and north-west Sweden. The blocking of cool and wet air in summer, as well as the greater landmass, leads to warm and dry summers far north in the country, with quite warm summers at the Bothnia Bay coast at 65 degrees latitude, which is unheard of elsewhere in the world at such northerly coastlines.

It is predicted that as the Barents Sea gets less frozen in the coming winters, becoming thus "Atlantified", additional evaporation will increase future snowfalls in Sweden and much of continental Europe.

Swedish Meteorological Institute, SMHI's monthly average temperatures of some of their weather stations – for the latest scientific full prefixed thirty-year period 1961–1990
Next will be presented in year 2020. The weather stations are sorted from south towards north by their numbers.

Extremes

Extreme points 

The extreme points of Sweden include the coordinates that are farthest north, south, east and west in Sweden, and the ones that are at the highest and the lowest elevations in the country. Unlike Norway and Denmark, Sweden has no external territories that can be considered either inside or outside the country depending on definition, meaning that the extreme points of Sweden are unambiguous.

The latitude and longitude are expressed in decimal degree notation, in which a positive latitude value refers to the Northern Hemisphere, and a negative value refers to the Southern Hemisphere. Additionally, a negative elevation value refers to land below sea level. The coordinates used in this article are sourced from Google Earth, which makes use of the World Geodetic System (WGS) 84, a geodetic reference system.

Latitude and longitude 

Sweden's northernmost point is Treriksröset, in the Lapland province, where the borders of Sweden, Norway, and Finland meet. The closest Swedish city to the area is Kiruna, which is Sweden's northernmost city. Sweden's southernmost point is in the harbour of the fishing village Smygehuk, near the city of Trelleborg, which borders the Baltic Sea. At the pier of the harbour, a signpost displays the exact position of the point, as well as the distance to Treriksröset, Stockholm, Berlin, Paris, and Moscow.

Sweden's westernmost point is on Stora Drammen, an islet in Skagerrak outside the coast of Bohuslän. Seabirds and harbor seals have colonies on the islet, but it is uninhabited by humans. Sweden's easternmost point is on Kataja, an islet south of Haparanda in the Bothnian Bay. The islet is divided between Sweden and Finland. The border was established in 1809, after the Finnish War, between what was previously two islets, a Swedish one called Kataja and a smaller Finnish one called Inakari. Since 1809, post-glacial rebound has caused the sea level in the region to drop relative to land level, joining the two islets. If counting the mainland only, Stensvik in Strömstad is Sweden's westernmost point, and Sundholmen in Haparanda is the easternmost point.

Elevation 

It is in the Scandinavian Mountains chain, in the province of Lapland. If the summers of 2016 and 2017 get as warm as the previous years, the northern peak will become the highest.

The point is at the bottom of what was once Nosabyviken, a bay on the lake of Hammarsjön. The bay was drained in the 1860s by John Nun Milner, an engineer, to get more arable land for Kristianstad.

Transportation 
Only public transportation.

See also 

Geographical center of Sweden
List of cities in Sweden
List of islands of Sweden
List of lakes in Sweden
List of municipalities of Sweden
List of national parks of Sweden
List of rivers in Sweden
 Climate of Sweden

Notes

References 

 

 

it:Svezia#Geografia